Jonathan Ryan Pardi (born May 20, 1985) is an American country music singer and songwriter. Signed to Capitol Nashville, he has released four studio albums: Write You a Song (2014), California Sunrise (2016), Heartache Medication (2019), and Mr. Saturday Night (2022). Pardi has also charted fourteen singles on the Billboard Hot Country Songs and Country Airplay charts, of which four have hit number one on the latter: "Head Over Boots", "Dirt on My Boots", "Heartache Medication" and "Last Night Lonely". Pardi's music style is defined by neotraditional country influences.

Biography
Pardi grew up in Dixon, California, where he attended Dixon High School, graduating in 2003. Pardi started writing music at age 12, and by 14, the young singer formed his own small band. After high school, he moved to Nashville to pursue his music career.

Music career

2010–2015: Beginnings and Write You a Song
In 2010, Pardi toured as an opening act for labelmate Dierks Bentley.

In March 2012, Pardi released his debut single, "Missin' You Crazy". It debuted at number 58 on the U.S. Billboard Hot Country Songs chart for the week of April 14, 2012, and peaked at number 29. It received three stars from Taste of Countrys Billy Dukes. "Up All Night", his second single, was released in that same month in 2013, and became his first top 10 hit. His third single, "What I Can't Put Down", was also released that month in 2014. The album's fourth single, "When I've Been Drinkin'", was released to country radio on September 22, 2014. Those four songs all appear on Pardi's debut studio album, Write You a Song, which was released on January 14, 2014, via Capitol Nashville. In May 2015, Pardi released a six-song extended play of songs recorded for but not included on Write You a Song, titled The B-Sides, 2011–2014.

Pardi served as one of the opening acts on Alan Jackson's "Keepin' It Country Tour" and on Dierks Bentley's Riser Tour, both in 2014. His first headlining tour was the "Up All Night Tour" in late 2014, with Joey Hyde as the opening act.  In August 2015, Pardi announced an 18-show headlining tour with Brothers Osborne as the opening act, named the All-Time High Tour, with dates from October through January 2016.

2016–2018: California Sunrise
Pardi's second studio album, titled California Sunrise, was announced in March 2016, with a release date of June 17, 2016. The album's lead single was "Head Over Boots". In 2016, this song became Pardi's first number-one single on the Country Airplay charts; it also held the number-one position on the Billboard Year-End chart for Country Airplay. After this came "Dirt on My Boots", written by Rhett Akins, Jesse Frasure, and Ashley Gorley, which also topped Country Airplay. The album accounted for three more singles after these: "Heartache on the Dance Floor", "She Ain't in It", and "Night Shift".

2019–present: Heartache Medication
In 2019, Pardi joined Brooks & Dunn on a new version of their hit single "My Next Broken Heart" for their album Reboot. In an interview, Ronnie Dunn revealed that, while some of the guest artists on their album had an ideas of what they wanted their duets to sound like that differed from Brooks & Dunn's recordings, Pardi was insistent that they record the song exactly as it had been in 1991 as he was such a big fan of the original.

On May 20, 2019, one day after appearing as a guest on the season finale of American Idol Pardi released the staunchly neotraditional track "Heartache Medication", the lead single and title track to his third studio album, also titled Heartache Medication.

On March 16, 2020, Pardi released "Ain't Always the Cowboy" as a single, where it peaked at 3 on Billboard's Country Airplay, 6 on the Hot Country Songs chart, and 55 on the Hot 100. On August 14, 2020, Pardi released the cover album Rancho Fiesta Sessions, which included covers of various country and rock tracks. On August 28, 2020, Pardi released the "Western Version" of "Ain't Always the Cowboy". On October 2, 2020, Pardi released the deluxe edition of Heartache Medication, which featured two new tracks and the "Western Version" of "Ain't Always the Cowboy". Pardi contributed a cover of the Metallica song "Wherever I May Roam" to the charity tribute album The Metallica Blacklist, released in September 2021.

Pardi released his fourth album, Mr. Saturday Night, in September 2022. The album's lead single "Last Night Lonely" charted earlier in the year.

Personal life
On October 2, 2019, Pardi got engaged to his girlfriend, hairdresser Summer Duncan. He proposed to her while on stage during his concert at the Ryman Auditorium in Nashville. The couple married on November 21, 2020. On September 21, 2022, the couple announced that they were expecting their first child.  They welcomed a baby girl, Presley Fawn Pardi, on February 18, 2023.

DiscographyStudio albumsWrite You a Song (2014)
California Sunrise (2016)
Heartache Medication (2019)
Mr. Saturday Night (2022)

ToursHeadlining2014: Up All Night Tour (Fall tour promoting album)
2015/2016:  All Time High Tour, presented by Texas Roadhouse
2017: CMT on Tour Presents "Jon Pardi's Lucky Tonight Tour" 
2019: Heartache Medication Tour (Fall tour promoting album)
2022: Ain't Always the Cowboy Tour 
 Supporting'
2014: Riser Tour with Dierks Bentley
2015: Keepin' It Country Tour with Alan Jackson
2016: Me And My Kind- Fall Tour with Kip Moore
2017: What The Hell World Tour with Dierks Bentley
2018: Livin' Like Hippies Tour with Miranda Lambert
2018: What Makes You Country Tour with Luke Bryan
2019: Burning Man Tour with Dierks Bentley

Television appearances

Awards and nominations

References

American country singer-songwriters
American male singer-songwriters
Country musicians from California
Capitol Records artists
People from Dixon, California
Singer-songwriters from California
21st-century American singers
21st-century American male singers
1985 births
Living people